This is a list of members of the Victorian Legislative Council, as elected at the 2018 state election. It includes members who were appointed to replace members who left office during this period.

Current distribution of seats

Members 

 Justice MLC Catherine Cumming resigned from the party on 18 December 2018, before being sworn in, and served as an independent member.
 Labor MLC Philip Dalidakis resigned on 17 June 2019. He was replaced by Enver Erdogan on 15 August 2019.
 Liberal MLC Mary Wooldridge resigned on 8 December 2019. She was replaced by Matthew Bach on 5 March 2020.
 Labor MLC Gavin Jennings resigned on 23 March 2020. He was replaced by Lee Tarlamis on 23 April 2020.
 Labor MLC Adem Somyurek left the Labor Party to sit as an independent member on 15 June 2020.
 Labor MLC Jenny Mikakos resigned on 26 September 2020. She was replaced by Sheena Watt on 13 October 2020.
 Liberal MLC Edward O'Donohue resigned on 1 December 2021. He was replaced by Cathrine Burnett-Wake on 2 December 2021.
 Labor MLC Kaushaliya Vaghela left the Labor Party to sit as an independent member on 7 March 2022. 
 Liberal Democrats MLC David Limbrick resigned on 11 April 2022. He returned to the seat on 22 June 2022.
 Liberal MLC Bernie Finn was expelled from the Liberal Party on 24 May 2022 for "a series of inflammatory social media posts". He later joined the Democratic Labour Party on 2 June 2022.
 Labor MLC Jane Garrett died on 2 July 2022. She was replaced by Tom McIntosh on 17 August 2022.

References

Members of the Parliament of Victoria by term
21st-century Australian politicians
Victorian Legislative Council